Robert Bussière is a Canadian politician, who was elected to the National Assembly of Quebec in the 2018 provincial election. He represents the electoral district of Gatineau as a member of the Coalition Avenir Québec.

Prior to his election to the legislature, Bussière served as mayor of La Pêche.

References

Living people
Coalition Avenir Québec MNAs
21st-century Canadian politicians
People from Outaouais
Mayors of places in Quebec
Year of birth missing (living people)